Orlando Luis Merced Villanueva (born November 2, 1966) is a former Major League Baseball first baseman and outfielder. He played all or parts of 13 seasons in the majors for the Pittsburgh Pirates (1990–1996), Toronto Blue Jays (1997), Minnesota Twins (1998), Boston Red Sox (1998), Chicago Cubs (1998), Montreal Expos (1999), and Houston Astros (2001–2003). He also played one season for the Orix BlueWave (2000) in Japan. He is currently the hitting coach for the Jamestown Jammers.

Career
Merced was signed as an amateur free agent out of high school at the age of 17 by the Pittsburgh Pirates in 1985. Six years later, he made his major league debut. He played for the Pirates for another six years, where he helped the Pirates win the National League East Division in three consecutive seasons, from 1990 through 1992. He was part of the Astros' 2001 NL Central Division champions.

He finished second in voting for 1991 National League Rookie of the Year, behind Jeff Bagwell.

In thirteen seasons, he played in 1,391 games.

Personal life
Merced has four children, three brothers and three sisters.

External links

1966 births
Living people
Augusta Pirates players
Boston Red Sox players
Buffalo Bisons (minor league) players
Chicago Cubs players
Gigantes de Carolina players
Gulf Coast Pirates players
Harrisburg Senators players
Houston Astros players
Indios de Mayagüez players
Macon Pirates players
Major League Baseball first basemen
Major League Baseball left fielders
Major League Baseball players from Puerto Rico
Major League Baseball right fielders
Mexican League baseball managers
Minnesota Twins players
Montreal Expos players
New Orleans Zephyrs players
Nippon Professional Baseball first basemen
Orix BlueWave players
Pittsburgh Pirates players
Puerto Rican expatriate baseball people in Mexico
Puerto Rican expatriate baseball players in Japan
Puerto Rican expatriate baseball players in Canada
Salem Buccaneers players
Toronto Blue Jays players
Watertown Pirates players